The Serpentine Lakes is a chain of salt lakes in the Great Victoria Desert of Australia. It runs for almost  along the border between South Australia and Western Australia. Most of it is located in the Mamungari Conservation Park. The Anne Beadell Highway crosses the northernmost arm of the lake.

The Serpentine Lakes are considered an important wetlands area. They form part of a major palaeo-drainage system, a now-inactive drainage system from the Palaeozoic era. The surface of the lake normally consists of dry clay, silt and sand, and is covered with a salty crust. The sediment is mostly quartz arenite. The lakes form the main channel of the palaeo-drainage system. Other channels are covered by sand dunes and are not well defined.

Tektites high in magnesium have been found in these lakes.

See also

 List of lakes of Australia

References

Lakes of Goldfields-Esperance (Western Australia)
Saline lakes of South Australia
Serpentine
Great Victoria Desert